Harrison Steele (born 12 October 2002), is an Australian professional footballer who plays as a central midfielder for Central Coast Mariners.

References

External links

Living people
Australian soccer players
Association football midfielders
Central Coast Mariners FC players
National Premier Leagues players
A-League Men players
2002 births